Vashon Municipal Airport is a municipal airport on Vashon Island in King County, Washington, United States. The airport is unique in being one of the few public airports in Washington State with only a grass runway. Other state-owned public grass-only runway airports exist in Washington, but these are actually more accurately landing strips, as they are not equipped with hangars.

Facilities and aircraft 
The airport contains a sculpture commemorating a 1968 UFO sighting.

For the 12-month period ending September 1, 2009, the airport had 10,020 aircraft operations, an average of 27 per day: 99.8% general aviation and 0.2% air taxi. At that time there were 34 aircraft based at this airport: 91% single-engine and 9% ultralight.

Commercial air service 
Vashon Island Air provides FAA Part 135 Air Charter Service on the island.

References

External links 
 Aerial photo as of 10 July 1990 from USGS The National Map
 

Airports in King County, Washington
Airport
Airports with year of establishment missing